An Unquiet Mind: A Memoir of Moods and Madness is a memoir written by American clinical psychologist and bipolar disorder researcher Kay Redfield Jamison and published in 1995. The book details Jamison's experience with bipolar disorder and how it affected her in various areas of her life from childhood up until the writing of the book. Narrated in the first person, the book shows the effect of manic-depressive illness in family and romantic relationships, professional life, and self-awareness, and highlights both the detrimental effects of the illness and the few positive ones. The book was originally published in hardcover by Alfred A. Knopf, Inc. in New York and reprinted by Vintage Books in paperback in 1997.

Synopsis

Part 1: The Wild Blue Yonder 
Jamison describes her childhood and early life as part of a military family and the effects that had on her life, including a very conservative upbringing and the need to make new friends after every relocation. She recalls having a very happy childhood, and a supportive family. Her father was creative and charismatic and her mother kind and yet resourceful. In her adolescence she showed an interest in science and medicine which later switched to psychology. When her family moves to California, her family life deteriorates with her father becoming more prone to depressive episodes and her mother busy pursuing professional goals. It is at this time, her senior year in high school, that Jamison experiences her first episode of hypomania, followed by her first episode of depression, which she was able to go through passing as normal. Some time later Jamison starts her undergraduate studies at UCLA, where she determines clinical psychology as her career path. After finishing her undergraduate, Jamison earns her Ph.D. in clinical psychology from UCLA and becomes a professor in the Department of Psychiatry.

Part 2: A Not So Fine Madness 
Jamison describes her episodes of mania and how they related to her personal and professional life. Her heightened energy and emotions make her a social at work and very efficient with her responsibilities, but irritable and restless in her marriage, which leads her to separating from her husband. She describes periods of reckless spending as characteristic of her mania, and how her brother helped her fix her financial situation. Jamison describes how, in her mania, her brain couldn't focus to read a single paragraph or listen to a song. Shortly after this she seeks treatment for the first time, and a colleague confronts her with her need to take lithium for her disease. Around this time Jamison starts seeing a psychiatrist with whom she starts psychotherapy sessions that would become a part of her routine for the rest of her life. 

Against medical advice, Jamison went off lithium several times, sometimes to get away from the side effects, and others related to her own rejection of her diagnosis. It was in one of these events and during a severe depressive episode that Jamison has a suicide attempt, in which she takes an overdose of lithium. Her attempt was deterred by a phone call from her brother, who finds her semi-alert and slurring and calls for help. After this, Jamison describes the number of people in her life that resolved to keep an eye and take care of her during her episodes, including her mother, brother and friends. Months after her suicide attempt, Jamison founds the Affective Disorders Clinic and applies for tenure at UCLA, which is granted.

Part 3: This Medicine, Love 
Jamison narrates major events in her romantic life. After the end of her first marriage, she falls in love and starts dating a man named David, a British psychiatrist with the Army Medical Corps. After spending a few days together where she lived in L.A., they spend several weeks in London which made her "remember how important love is to life". David was to her always loving, kind, and reassuring, and Jamison admits to enjoying life like she hadn't for years. After she returns to LA, David is posted to an army hospital in Hong Kong, where he plans for her to meet him. Before this can happen, however, a diplomatic courier comes to her house with the news that David had died of a massive heart attack while in duty. Jamison retells her months of grief about David's death, from feeling numb and detached during the funeral in London at first, to breaking down in the British Airways counter when they asked her the reason of her visit, to being able to remember David with fondness without regretting the future they'd lost. 

Once back home, Jamison has an adjustment to her lithium levels, which greatly diminished the side effects without removing its effectiveness against the symptoms of bipolar disorder. Some time after, she meets Richard Wyatt, the man that would become her second husband and with whom she shares a more "opposites attract" relationship, which led to a rapidly evolving relationship that led her to leave her tenure position at UCLA to live in Washington with him.

Part 4: An Unquiet Mind 
Jamison talks about the renaming of her disease from manic-depressive illness to bipolar disorder, and rebels against the change, arguing that the new name is not descriptive enough of the disease and suggests a separation between depression and manic-depressive illness which is not always clear or accurate. 

She tells her account of witnessing the first evidence of a genetic component to bipolar disease, and sitting with Jim Watson talking about mood disorders and family trees. After this genetic connection is made, Jamison talks about her struggle with her desire to have children. Later she recounts the recommendation of a physician she saw once to not have any because of her disease. Jamison calls not having her own children "the single most intolerable regret of [her] life", but describes her relationship with her niece and nephew and how she enjoys it. 

In her new life in Washington, Jamison starts working in the Department of Psychiatry at the Johns Hopkins Medical School. She is apprehensive to disclose her illness to her new coworkers but does so to not jeopardize the care of her patients and make her superiors aware of the legal risk. Despite her fears, she describes being very accepted and supported in her work environment in Hopkins, as well as maintaining an optimistic view of the future of her illness.

Reception 
The book received a positive reception, with Jamison being praised for her bravery. 

In 2009, Melody Moezzi, an Iranian-American attorney who is diagnosed with bipolar disorder, reviewed An Unquiet Mind for National Public Radio. She described the memoir as "the most brilliant and brutally honest book I've ever read about bipolar disorder". Moezzi stated that "an unquiet mind need not be a deficient one".

A 2011 review in The Guardian held that An Unquiet Mind'' has been unrivaled in its honesty about life with bipolar disorder.

The British comedian and actor Alan Davies praised the book in an episode of the panel show Qi

Publication history 
The book was originally published in hardcover by Alfred A. Knopf, Inc. in New York and reprinted by Vintage Books in paperback in 1997.

References 

Redirects from books
Books about bipolar disorder
